Kars is a city in northeast Turkey and the capital of Kars Province. Its population was 73,836 in 2011. Kars, in classical historiography (Strabo), was in the ancient region known as Chorzene, part of the province of Ayrarat in the Kingdom of Armenia, and later the capital of the Bagratid Kingdom of Armenia from 929–961. Currently, the mayor of Kars is Türker Öksüz. The city had an Armenian ethnic majority until it was conquered by Turkish nationalist forces in late 1920.

Etymology 
The city's name may be derived from the Armenian word հարս (hars), meaning "bride". Another hypothesis has it that the name derives from the Georgian word for "the gate."

History

Medieval period
Little is known of the early history of Kars beyond the fact that, during medieval times, it had its own dynasty of Armenian rulers and was the capital of a region known as Vanand. Medieval Armenian historians referred to the city by a variety of names, including "Karuts' K'aghak'" (Kars city), "Karuts' Berd", "Amrots'n Karuts'" (both meaning Kars Fortress) and "Amurn Karuts'" (Impenetrable Kars). At some point in the ninth century (at least by 888) it entered into the domains of the Armenian Bagratunis. Kars was the capital of the Bagratid Kingdom of Armenia between 929 and 961. During this period the town's cathedral, later known as the Church of the Holy Apostles, was built.

In 963, shortly after the Bagratuni seat was transferred to Ani, Kars became the capital of a separate independent kingdom, again called Vanand. However, the extent of its actual independence from the Kingdom of Ani is uncertain: it was always in the possession of the relatives of the rulers of Ani, and, after Ani's capture by the Byzantine Empire in 1045, the Bagratuni title "King of Kings" held by the ruler of Ani was transferred to the ruler of Kars.

In 1064, just after the capture of Ani by Alp Arslan (leader of the Seljuk Turks), the Armenian king of Kars, Gagik-Abas, paid homage to the victorious Turks so that they would not lay siege to his city. In 1065 Gagik-Abas ceded his kingdom to the Byzantine Empire, but soon after Kars was taken by the Seljuk Turks.

The Seljuks quickly relinquished direct control over Kars and it became a small emirate whose territory corresponded closely to that of Vanand, and which bordered the similarly created but larger Shaddadid emirate centered at Ani. The Kars emirate was a vassal of the Saltukids in Erzurum, whose forces were effective in opposing Georgian attempts at seizing Kars. Thus, it was only in 1206 that Zakare of the Zakarids–Mkhargrdzeli succeeded in capturing Kars, joining it to their fiefdom of Ani. It was conquered in 1242 by the Mongols and later Kars fell under Georgian influence. During the reign of David IX of Georgia, the Ilkhanate occupied the southern territories of the Kingdom of Georgia, which included Kars. By 1358, the city was ruled by the Jalayirids and in 1380 it fell to the Qara Qoyunlu. In 1387 the city was leveled and the surrounding countryside was devastated by Timur (Tamerlane). Anatolian beyliks followed for some time after that, until it firstly fell into the hands of the Qara Qoyunlu and subsequent Aq Qoyunlu. After the Ak Koyunlu, as it went naturally for almost all their former territories, the city fell into the hands of the newly established Safavid dynasty of Iran, founded by king Ismail I. Following the Peace of Amasya of 1555 that followed the Ottoman–Safavid War of 1533–1555, the city was declared neutral, and its existing fortress was destroyed. In 1585, during the Ottoman–Safavid War of 1579–1590, the Ottomans took the city alongside Tabriz. On June 8, 1604, during the next bout of hostilities between the two archrivals, the Ottoman–Safavid War of 1603–1618, Safavid ruler Abbas I retook the city from the Ottomans. The fortifications of the city were rebuilt by the Ottoman Sultan Murad III and were strong enough to withstand a siege by Nader Shah of Persia, in 1731. It became the head of a sanjak in the Ottoman Erzurum vilayet. In August 1745, a huge Ottoman army was routed at Kars by Nader Shah during the Ottoman–Persian War of 1743–1746. As a result, the Turks fled westwards, raiding their own lands as they went.

Russian administration

In 1807 Kars successfully resisted an attack by the Russian Empire. During a break between the Russian campaigns in the region conducted against the Ottomans, in 1821, commander-in-chief Abbas Mirza of Qajar Iran occupied Kars, further igniting the Ottoman-Persian War of 1821-1823. After another Russian siege in 1828 the city was surrendered by the Ottomans on June 23, 1828, to the Russian general Count Ivan Paskevich, 11,000 men becoming prisoners of war. At the end of the war it returned to Ottoman control for diplomatic reasons, Russia gaining only two border forts. During the Crimean War, an Ottoman garrison led by British officers, including General William Fenwick Williams, kept the Russians at bay during a protracted siege, but after the garrison had been devastated by cholera and food supplies were depleted, the town was surrendered to General Mouravieff in November 1855.

The city's significance increased as the Ottoman and Russian empires contested its possession. The fortress was stormed by the Russians in the Battle of Kars during the Russo-Turkish War, 1877-78 under generals Loris-Melikov and Ivan Lazarev. Following the war, Kars was transferred to Russia by the Treaty of San Stefano. Kars became the capital of the Kars Okrug and larger Kars Oblast ("region"), comprising the okrugs ("districts") of Kars, Ardahan, Kagizman, and Olti, which was the most southwesterly extension of the Russian Transcaucasus. In the following years the Russians supported the fortification of Kars.

From 1878 to 1881 more than 82,000 Muslims from formerly Ottoman-controlled territory migrated to the Ottoman Empire. Among those there were more than 11,000 people from the city of Kars. At the same time, many Armenians and Pontic Greeks (here usually called Caucasus Greeks) migrated to the region from the Ottoman Empire and other regions of Transcaucasia. According to the Russian census data, by 1897 Armenians formed 49.7%, Russians 26.3%, Caucasus Greeks 11.7%, Poles 5.3% and Turks 3.8%.

World War I

In the First World War, the city was one of the main objectives of the Ottoman army during the lost Battle of Sarikamish in the Caucasus Campaign. Russia ceded Kars, Ardahan and Batum to the Ottoman Empire under the Treaty of Brest-Litovsk on 3 March 1918. However, by then Kars was under the effective control of Armenian and non-Bolshevik Russian forces. The Ottoman Empire captured Kars on 25 April 1918, but under the Armistice of Mudros (October 1918) was required to withdraw to the pre-war frontier and Kars came under control of the First Republic of Armenia. The Ottomans refused to relinquish Kars; its military governor instead established a government, the Provisional National Government of the Southwestern Caucasus, led by Fahrettin Pirioglu, that claimed Turkish sovereignty over Kars and Turkic-speaking regions as far as Batumi and Alexandropol (Gyumri). Much of the region fell under the administrative control of Armenia in January 1919 but the pro-Turkish government remained in the city until a joint operation launched by British and Armenian troops dissolved it on 19 April 1919, arresting its leaders and sending them to Malta. In May 1919 Kars came under the full administration of the Armenian Republic and became the capital of its Vanand province.

Skirmishes between the Turkish revolutionaries and Armenian border troops in Olti took place during the summer of 1920. In the autumn of that year four Turkish divisions under the command of General Kâzım Karabekir invaded the Armenian Republic, triggering the Turkish-Armenian War. Kars had been fortified to withstand a lengthy siege but, to the astonishment of all, was taken with little resistance by Turkish forces on 30 October 1920, in what some modern scholars have called one of the worst military fiascoes in Armenian history. The terms of the Treaty of Alexandropol, signed by the representatives of Armenia and Turkey on 2 December 1920, forced Armenia to give back all the Ottoman territories granted to it in the Treaty of Sèvres.

After the Bolshevik advance into Armenia, the Treaty of Alexandropol was superseded by the Treaty of Kars (October 23, 1921), signed between Turkey and the Soviet Union. The treaty allowed for Soviet annexation of Adjara in exchange for Turkish control of the regions of Kars, Igdir, and Ardahan. The Treaty of Kars established peaceful relations between the two nations, but as early as 1939, some British diplomats noted indications that the Soviet Union was not satisfied with the established border. The Treaty of Kars, signed in 1921 by the Government of the Grand National Assembly and by the Soviet republics of Armenia, Azerbaijan and Georgia, established the current north-eastern boundaries of Turkey. The treaty included de jure provisions guaranteeing the Armenian residents right to relinquish Turkish nationality, leave the territory freely and take with them either their goods or the proceeds of their sale, but by some accounts formerly Armenian lands had de facto become state property as a consequence of the treaty.

After World War II

After World War II, the Soviet Union attempted to annul the Kars treaty and regain the Kars region and the adjoining region of Ardahan. On June 7, 1945, Soviet Foreign Minister Vyacheslav Molotov told the Turkish ambassador to Moscow Selim Sarper that the regions should be returned to the Soviet Union, on behalf of the Georgian and Armenian republics. Turkey found itself in a difficult position: it wanted good relations with the Soviet Union, but at the same time they refused to give up the territories. Turkey itself was in no condition to fight a war with the Soviet Union, which had emerged as a superpower after the second world war. By the autumn of 1945, Soviet troops in the Caucasus were ordered to prepare for a possible invasion of Turkey. Prime Minister Winston Churchill objected to these territorial claims, while President Harry Truman initially felt that the matter should not concern other parties. With the onset of the Cold War, however, the United States came to see Turkey as a useful ally against Soviet expansion and began to support it financially and militarily. By 1948 the Soviet Union dropped its claims to Kars and the other regions.

Recent history 
In April 1993, Turkey closed its Kars border crossing with Armenia, in a protest against the capture of the Kelbajar district of Azerbaijan by Armenian forces during the First Nagorno-Karabakh War. Since then the land border between Armenia and Turkey has remained closed. In 2006, former Kars mayor Naif Alibeyoğlu said that opening the border would boost the local economy and reawaken the city. Despite unsuccessful attempts to establish diplomatic relations between the two countries in 2009, there remained opposition and pressure from the local population against the re-opening of the border. Under pressure from Azerbaijan, and the local population, including the 20% ethnic Azerbaijani minority, the Turkish foreign minister Ahmet Davutoğlu reiterated in 2010 and 2011 that opening the border with Armenia was out of the question. , the border remains closed.

The last elected mayor of Kars was Ayhan Bilgen of the Peoples' Democratic Party (HDP), who was elected in 2019, and arrested and deposed in 2020. He was replaced by the governor of Kars Province, Eyüp Tepe, as a government-appointed trustee.

Demographics
According to Turkey's 2011 Statistical Yearbook, the area has been depopulating because of migration to bigger cities. In Istanbul alone, there are 269,388 people from Kars, more than three times the city's population.

Today, Kars has a mixed population of Azerbaijanis, Kurds and Turks.

The Azerbaijanis are mainly composed of the Terekeme and Qarapapaq sub-ethnic groups. The Shia Azerbaijanis make up 20% of the city's population.

Most of the population in Kars is Sunni Muslim, mainly made up by the population of Kurds and Turks, and the minority is Shia Muslim, mainly among the Azerbaijanis.

Government

The ethnic make-up of Kars is also reflected in politics, with the Turks and Azerbaijanis often voting for the nationalist MHP and the Kurds often voting for the pro-Kurdish HDP. On 30 March 2014, Murtaza Karaçanta (MHP) was elected mayor. During the June 2015 elections, Kars was won by the pro-Kurdish HDP, becoming the largest political party in both the city and the province of Kars. The last elected mayor was Ayhan Bilgen from the HDP until he was deposed in October 2020.

Climate 
Kars has a humid continental climate (Köppen: Dfb, Trewartha: Dcb). It experiences significant seasonal and diurnal temperature variation, due to its location away from large bodies of water, its high elevation and location, where the high plateau of Eastern Anatolia converges with the Lesser Caucasus mountain range.

Summers are generally brief and quite warm with cool nights.

Winters are very cold. Kars experiences frequent and sometimes heavy snowfall, with four months of snow cover on average.

Due to its geographical location, the city itself has a slightly milder climate compared to the surrounding region. Some hills and peaks in the province, especially around the Sarıkamış region, are subarctic (Köppen: Dfc, Trewartha: Ec) due to the higher elevation of the region. Summers and winters are colder in these areas, with winter temperatures reaching  more regularly.

Sports 
The town has a football club Kars S.K. Bandy, a sport which does not exist in Turkey today, was once played here.

Education 
Kars hosts the Kafkas University, which was established in 1992.

Transport 

Kars is served by a main highway from Erzurum, and lesser roads run north to Ardahan and south to Igdir. The town has an airport (Kars Harakani Airport), with daily direct flights to Ankara and Istanbul. Kars is served by a station on the Turkish Railways (TCDD) that links it to Erzurum. This line was originally laid when Kars was within the Russian Empire and connected the city to nearby Alexandropol and Tiflis, with a wartime, narrow-gauge extension running to Erzurum. Turkey's border crossings with Armenia, including the rail link, the Kars-Gyumri-Tbilisi railway, have regrettably been closed since April 1993. Turkey's border with Armenia was closed down after local Armenian forces occupied the Kalbajar District (adjacent to disputed Nagorno Karabakh) in Azerbaijan. (As of September 2018, Turkey maintains that the border will remain closed until Armenia ends its occupation). Construction on a new line, the Kars–Tbilisi–Baku railway, intended to connect Turkey with Georgia and Azerbaijan, began in 2010. The line became operational on October 30, 2017. The line connects Kars to Akhalkalaki in Georgia, from where trains will continue to Tbilisi, and Baku in Azerbaijan.

Places of interest

Kars Citadel

The Castle of Kars, also known as the Citadel, sits at the top a rocky hill overlooking Kars. Its walls date back to the Bagratuni Armenian period (there is surviving masonry on the north side of the castle) but it probably took on its present form during the thirteenth century when Kars was ruled by the Zak'arid dynasty.

The walls bear crosses in several places, including a Khachkar with a building inscription in Armenian on the easternmost tower, so the much repeated statement that Kars castle was built by Ottoman Sultan Murad III during the war with Persia, at the close of the sixteenth century, is inaccurate. However, Murad probably ordered the reconstruction of much of the city walls (they are similar to those that the Ottoman army constructed at Ardahan). During the eighteenth century, at the Battle of Kars (1745), a crushing defeat was inflicted upon the Ottoman army by the Persian conqueror, Nader Shah, not far from the city of Kars.

By the nineteenth century the citadel had lost most of its defensive purpose and a series of outer fortresses and defensive works were constructed to encircle Kars – this new defensive system proved particularly notable during the Siege of Kars in 1855.

Other historical structures 

Below the castle is a mosque, formerly the Armenian church known as Surb Arak'elots, the Church of the Holy Apostles. Built in the 930's, it has a tetraconch plan (a square with four semicircular apses) surmounted by a spherical dome on a cylindrical drum. On the exterior, the drum contains bas-relief depictions of twelve figures, usually interpreted as representing the Twelve Apostles. The dome has a conical roof. The church was converted to a mosque in 1579, and then converted into a Russian Orthodox church in the 1880s. The Russians built porches in front of the church's three entrances, and an elaborate clocktower (now demolished) next to the church. The church was used as a warehouse from the 1930s, and it housed a small museum from 1963 until the late 1970s. Then the building was left to itself for about two decades, until it was converted into a mosque in 1993. In the same district of Kars are two other ruined Armenian churches. A Russian church from the 1900s was converted to a mosque in the 1980s after serving as a school gymnasium.

The Grand Mosque of Kars is the largest historic mosque in the city. Built by the Seljuks, it was restored by the Ottomans in 1579.

The "Taşköprü" (Stone Bridge) is a bridge over the Kars river, built in 1725. Close to the bridge are three old bath-houses, none of them operating any longer.

As a settlement at the juncture of Turkish, Armenian, Georgian, Kurdish and Russian cultures, the buildings of Kars come in a variety of architectural styles. Most Russian-era buildings in Kars are identical in architectural style to those of Gyumri in Armenia. Orhan Pamuk in the novel Snow, set in Kars, makes repeated references to "the Russian houses", built "in a Baltic style", whose like cannot be seen anywhere else in Turkey, and deplores the deteriorating condition of these houses.
 The Mansion of Ahmet Tevfik Pasha (Ahmet Tevfik Paşa Konağı)
 The Stone Bridge (Taşköprü)
 The Topchuoglu Bath House (Topçuoğlu Hamamı)
 The Ilbeoglu Bath House (İlbeyoğlu Hamamı)
 The Mazlumaga Bath House (Mazlumağa Hamamı)
 The House of Namık Kemal (Namık Kemal Evi)
 The Palace of Beylerbeyi (Beylerbeyi Sarayı)
 The Mansion of Pasha (Paşa Konağı)
 The Cemetery of Arap Baba (Arap Baba Şehitliği)
 The Mosque of Yusuf Pasha (Yusuf Paşa Camii)
 The Mosque of Evliya (Evliya Camii)
 The Tomb of Ebul Hasan-i Harakani (Ebul Hasan-i Harakani Türbesi)
 The Mosque of Fethiye (Fethiye Camii)
 The Mansion of Gazi Ahmet Muhtar Pasha (Gazi Ahmet Paşa Konağı)

International relations

Twin towns – Sister cities
The municipality of Kars has developed sister city relationships with following cities at home and abroad:

In popular culture
 Kars is the setting of the 2002 novel Kar (Snow) by Orhan Pamuk.
 Yerkir Nairi (Երկիր Նաիրի), a novel by Yeghishe Charents is dedicated to the public persons and places of Kars.
 Modest Mussorgsky composed the march "The Capture of Kars" to commemorate Russia's victory there in 1855.
 The film Kosmos (Cosmos) by Reha Erdem was filmed in and around Kars.
 In 1857 the settlement of Wellington in Ontario, Canada renamed itself Kars in honor of the Canadian-born General William Fenwick Williams who organized the defense of Kars during its 1855 siege.

References

Further reading

External links

 Pictures of the city and the nearby city of Ani
 700+ pictures of city, Kümbet Camii, Kale and Ani
 Kars Governor's Office
  The official city guide of the Kars municipality
 Kars News
 Kars Guide and Photo Album by Luc Wouters
 Kars Weather Forecast Information
 Treaty of Kars
 Atlas of Conflicts: The Treaty of Kars and Its Geopolitical Implications on Armenia by Dr. Andrew Andersen, Ph.D.
 VirtualANI - A history and description of the city of Kars
 Armenian History and Presence in Kars
 HitchHikers Handbook's guide to Kars
 3D Model of the Cathedral 
 Kars preservation project summary at Global Heritage Fund
 Explore Kars with Google Earth on Global Heritage Network
 Awarded "EDEN - European Destinations of Excellence" non traditional tourist destination 2009

 
Armenian Highlands
Former capitals of Armenia
Districts of Kars Province